The Rural Municipality of Strathcona is a former rural municipality (RM) in the Canadian province of Manitoba. It was originally incorporated as a rural municipality in April 1906. It ceased to exist on January 1, 2015, as a result of its provincially mandated amalgamation with the RM of Riverside to form the Rural Municipality of Prairie Lakes.

The former RM is located northeast of Killarney and was named for The 1st Baron Strathcona and Mount Royal.

Communities 
 Belmont
 Hartney Junction
 Hilton

References 

 Geographic Names of Manitoba (pg. 265) - the Millennium Bureau of Canada

External links 
 Rural Municipality of Strathcona (copy archived February 3, 2015)
 Map of Strathcona R.M. at Statcan

Strathcona
Populated places disestablished in 2015
2015 disestablishments in Manitoba